The Jacksonville College of Music was a private post-secondary music school in Jacksonville, Florida. Founded in 1923 by George Orner, Lyman P. Prior and William Meyer, it became accredited by the National Association of Schools of Music in 1931 or 1937. Its main campus was in downtown Jacksonville on Herschel Street.

The school merged with Jacksonville University on June 1, 1958, to become the College of Music of Jacksonville University.

References

Jacksonville University
Universities and colleges in Jacksonville, Florida
Educational institutions established in 1923
1923 establishments in Florida
Universities and colleges in the Jacksonville metropolitan area
Music schools in Florida